KLEO (106.1 FM) is a radio station broadcasting a hot adult contemporary format simulcasting co-owned KKBG from Hilo. Licensed to Kahaluu, Hawaii, United States.  The station is currently owned by Pacific Radio Group, Inc.

The call letters were previously used (1958-1980) by an AM radio station (1480) in Wichita, Kansas.

References

External links

LEO
Hot adult contemporary radio stations in the United States
Radio stations established in 1969
1969 establishments in Hawaii